Anthony Youdeowei is a Nigerian professor of Agricultural Entomology. He was acting vice chancellor, dean and executive chairman at the University of Ibadan Publishing House. He is a founding fellow of the African Academy of Sciences and The World Academy of Sciences.

Early life and education 
Youdeowei was born on 7 April 1937 in Abari, Delta State, Nigeria. He earned his first degree in Zoology from the University College of Ibadan (now University of Ibadan) in 1962 and a PhD in Agricultural Entomology in 1967 from the University of London.

Career

Academic career 
Youdeowei became a lecturer at the Department of Agricultural Biology in 1973 and a professor in 1990. During his academic career, he was a Head of the Department of Agricultural Biology, Dean of the Faculty of Agriculture and Forestry, Acting Vice Chancellor and Executive Director of the University of Ibadan Publishing House.

Scientific career 
Youdeowei joined West Africa Rice Development Association (WARDA, now Africa Rice) located in Bouaké in the Ivory Coast as a Director of Training and Communications. In 1997, he moved to Africa Regional Office of the Food and Agriculture Organization of the United Nations (FAO) located in Accra, Ghana, as a Consultant Senior Integrated Pest Management Specialist. He became a member of the Governing Council of ICIPE, the International Centre of Insect Physiology and Ecology Nairobi, Kenya in 2010.

References 

University of Ibadan alumni
University of London
1937 births
People from Delta State
Fellows of the African Academy of Sciences
TWAS fellows
Founder Fellows of the African Academy of Sciences
Living people